Buritis is a municipality in northern Minas Gerais state in Brazil. It is located just south of the Urucuia River, which is a tributary of the São Francisco River.

Location

Surrounding municipalities are Formoso, Arinos, Unaí, and  Formosa.
There are highway connections linking Buritis with  Formosa (approximately 130 km to the west taking BR-030), Unaí (approximately 130 km to the southwest), and Arinos (approximately 110 km. to the southeast).

The municipality contains 21% of the  Jaci Paraná Extractive Reserve, created in 1996.
It contains part of the Bom Futuro National Forest, established in 1988.

Economy
The economy is based on cattle raising (88,000 in 2006) and agriculture.  Buritis is a large producer of soybeans, beans, and corn.  There were some small transformation industries (41 in 2005) and commercial retail establishments (277 in 2005).  There were 19 restaurants and small hotels employing 10 workers in 2005.  Outside agriculture, the biggest employer in the town was probably public administration with 634 salaried workers in 2005.  In 2007 there were 2 financial institutions in the city.

Main agricultural crops in planted area (2006)
Coagulated rubber: 130 ha.
Coffee: 70 ha.
Oranges: 150 ha. 
Cotton: 1,600 ha. 
Rice: 870 ha. 
Sugarcane: 45 ha. 
Beans: 9,500 ha. 
Corn: 13,200 ha.
Soybeans: 55,000 ha. 
Sorghum: 2,000 ha.

Farm data for 2006
Number of farms: 1,342
Area of the farms: 305,085
Planted area: 66,800 ha. 
Area of natural pasture: 162,645
Agricultural workers (salaried): 933

Health and education
Hospitals (2005): 1 private hospital with 29 beds
Health clinics: 9 (8 public and 1 private)
Primary school enrollment: 5,044 (265 students in private schools)
Middle and secondary school enrollment: 891 (34 students in private schools)
Pre-school enrollment: 400 in public schools and 110 in private schools
Higher education: 1 with 105 students (2005)

Tourism
The Urucuia waterfall, located on the road that links Buritis to Arinos, has become a tourist attraction.  Nearby are the low mountains of Taquaril, Olhos D´água, Bonito, Bonita, São Vicente, Serra Geral and Morcego.

References

IBGE

Municipalities in Minas Gerais